Andrew Jean-Baptiste (born 16 June 1992) is a professional footballer who plays as a centre-back for Canadian club Valour FC. Born in the United States, he represents the Haiti national team.

Club career

Early career
Jean-Baptiste attended Brentwood High School on Long Island, New York. He was honored with the 2009 Long Island player of the year presented by Newsday. He played college soccer with the Connecticut Huskies from 2010–11. During his second year at UConn Jean-Baptiste was named the 2011 Big East Conference Defensive Player of the Year. During the 2010 season he also played for the New York Red Bulls U-23 team.

Portland Timbers
Jean-Baptiste was selected 8th overall by Portland Timbers in the first round of the 2012 MLS SuperDraft. In his first professional match for the Portland Timbers, Jean-Baptiste scored a header from a free-kick, assisted by Jack Jewsbury. Later in the season he was sent on loan to Los Angeles Blues and made 8 appearances for the club. During his second year Jean-Baptiste became a starter for Portland and appeared in 26 matches. Jean-Baptiste scored the game-winning goal on July 13, 2013 against the Los Angeles Galaxy, on a header from a corner kick by Diego Valeri.

Chivas USA
On December 12, 2013, Jean-Baptiste was traded to Chivas USA in exchange for Jorge Villafaña. In his one year with Chivas he appeared in 10 league matches, missing two months of the season due to injury.

New York Red Bulls
On January 27, 2015 the New York Red Bulls announced that they had signed Jean-Baptiste. Jean-Baptiste was loaned to affiliate side New York Red Bulls II during the 2015 season and made his debut for the side on April 4, 2015, coming on as a second-half substitute in a 4–1 victory over Toronto FC II, the first victory in club history.

Jean-Baptiste was released by New York Red Bulls on June 26, 2015.

Nyköpings BIS
After spending 14 months attempting to get a work permit in Spain, Jean-Baptiste signed for Swedish Ettan side Nyköpings BIS in August 2016.  He became a key player for the club, earning a contract extension before the end of the 2016 season. Jean-Baptiste made ten league appearances that season and scored one goal. The following season, he made 22 league appearances, scoring two goals, and made another two appearances in the Svenska Cupen.

Umeå FC
In February 2019, Jean-Baptiste signed for Swedish Ettan side Umeå FC. He made eleven league appearances that season, scoring one goal, and helped the club earn promotion to the Superettan via playoffs. On 22 August 2019, the club announced that Jean-Baptiste's contract had been terminated after an unspecified off-field incident.

Valour FC
On 14 January 2020, Jean-Baptiste signed with Canadian Premier League side Valour FC. He made his debut for Valour on August 16 against Cavalry FC, playing the full 90 minutes in a 2-0 defeat. The club announced Jean-Baptiste's return for the 2021 season on October 2, 2020. On July 22, 2021 Valour announced Jean-Baptiste had suffered a torn ACL injury in his left knee, sidelining him for the rest of the 2021 season. On October 18, he was re-signed for the 2022 season.

International career
Jean-Baptiste represented the United States in 2010 at the  Under 18 level.

He formally switched allegiance to the Haitian federation, and in June 2015 Jean-Baptiste was called up by the Haiti National team for the 2015 CONCACAF Gold Cup, and was on the bench for all 4 games. In May 2019 he was named to the Haitian squad for the 2019 CONCACAF Gold Cup.

International goals
Scores and results list Haiti's goal tally first.

Personal life
Jean-Bapiste was born in Brooklyn, New York City to a Haitian father and a Dominican Republic mother.

References

External links
 Connecticut Huskies bio
 
 
 

1992 births
Living people
Association football defenders
American soccer players
Haitian footballers
Sportspeople from Brooklyn
Soccer players from New York City
American sportspeople of Haitian descent
American sportspeople of Dominican Republic descent
Citizens of Haiti through descent
Haitian people of Dominican Republic descent
Brentwood High School (Brentwood, New York) alumni
American expatriate soccer players
Haitian expatriate footballers
Expatriate footballers in Spain
American expatriate sportspeople in Spain
Haitian expatriate sportspeople in Spain
Expatriate footballers in Sweden
American expatriate sportspeople in Sweden
Haitian expatriate sportspeople in Sweden
Expatriate footballers in Malaysia
American expatriate sportspeople in Malaysia
Haitian expatriate sportspeople in Malaysia
Expatriate soccer players in Canada
American expatriate sportspeople in Canada
Haitian expatriate sportspeople in Canada
UConn Huskies men's soccer players
New York Red Bulls U-23 players
Portland Timbers draft picks
Portland Timbers players
Orange County SC players
Chivas USA players
New York Red Bulls players
New York Red Bulls II players
Nyköpings BIS players
Umeå FC players
Valour FC players
USL League Two players
Major League Soccer players
USL Championship players
Malaysia Premier League players
Ettan Fotboll players
Canadian Premier League players
United States men's youth international soccer players
Haiti international footballers
2015 CONCACAF Gold Cup players
2019 CONCACAF Gold Cup players